The 1881 Birthday Honours were appointments by Queen Victoria to various orders and honours to reward and highlight good works by citizens of the British Empire. The appointments were made to celebrate the official birthday of the Queen, and were published in The London Gazette on 24 May 1881.
   
The recipients of honours are displayed here as they were styled before their new honour, and arranged by honour, with classes (Knight, Knight Grand Cross, etc.) and then divisions (Military, Civil, etc.) as appropriate.

United Kingdom and British Empire

The Most Honourable Order of the Bath

Knight Grand Cross of the Order of the Bath (GCB)

Military Division
Royal Navy
Vice-Admiral Sir Frederick Beauchamp Paget Seymour 

Army
General the Earl of Longford

Knight Commander of the Order of the Bath (KCB)

Military Division
Royal Navy
Admiral the Honourable Charles Gilbert John Brydone Elliot 
Admiral Edward Gennys Fanshawe 
Vice-Admiral the Right Honourable Lord John Hay 
Captain Frederick William Richards 

Army
General George Colt Langley 
General William Montagu Scott McMurdo 
General Lord Mark Kerr 
General His Serene Highness Prince Edward of Saxe-Weimar 
General John Thornton Grant 
Lieutenant-General George Vaughan Maxwell 
Lieutenant-General Alexander Macdonell 
Lieutenant-General Charles Pyndar Beauchamp Walker 
Lieutenant-General John Forbes 
Honorary Major-General John Coke 
Colonel Charles George Arbuthnot 
Colonel Charles Cooper Johnson  Bengal Staff Corps

Civil Division
Lieutenant-Colonel and Honorary Colonel William Fitzwilliam Lenox-Conyngham, Londonderry Militia
Lieutenant-Colonel and Honorary Colonel Hambleton Francis Custance, West Norfolk Militia
Lieutenant-Colonel Viscount Ranelagh, 2nd (South) Middlesex Rifle Volunteer Corps
Lieutenant-Colonel Robert Loyd-Lindsay  First Berkshire Rifle Volunteer Corps
Thomas Brassey, Honorary Commander of the Liverpool Brigade of Royal Naval Artillery Volunteers
Captain Frederick John Owen Evans 
Alfred Comyn Lyall

Companion of the Order of the Bath (CB)

Military Division
Royal Navy
Vice-Admiral Richard Dunning White
Vice-Admiral Edward Bridges Rice
Captain Sholto Douglas
Captain William Arthur

Army
Lieutenant-General Joseph Henry Laye 
Major-General Francis Peyton
Major-General John Henry Ford Elkington
Major-General James Gubbins
Major-General John Gordon
Major-General George Godfrey Pearse 
Colonel Reginald Gipps, Scots Guards
Colonel George Byng Harman, late Brigade Depot
Colonel Allen Bayard Johnson, Bengal Staff Corps
Colonel John Alexander Mathew Macdonald, Bombay Staff Corps
Colonel George Scougall Macbean, Bengal Staff Corps
Colonel Robert Crosse Stewart, late 2nd Foot
Colonel Frederick Dobson Middleton, late 29th Foot
Colonel the Honourable James Charlemagne Dormer, late 13th Foot
Colonel Rowley Sale Hill, Bengal Infantry
Colonel Charles Edward Cumberland, Royal Engineers
Colonel William French, Royal Artillery
Colonel John William Hoggan, Bengal Staff Corps
Colonel Thomas Gaily Ross, Bengal Staff Corps
Lieutenant-Colonel Frederick Macnaghten Armstrong, Bengal Staff Corps
Lieutenant-Colonel Dawson Stockley Warren, 14th Regiment
Lieutenant-Colonel Edward Donald Malcolm, Royal Engineers
Lieutenant-Colonel Alexander Copland, Bengal Staff Corps
Lieutenant-Colonel Cromer Ashburnham, 60th Regiment 
Lieutenant-Colonel Henry Augustus Bushman, 9th Lancers
Lieutenant-Colonel Charles Montizambert Stockwell, 72nd Regiment
Lieutenant-Colonel John Frederick Crease, Royal Marine Artillery
Major Joseph Philips, Royal Marine Light Infantry
Major John Ramsay Slade, Royal Artillery
Deputy Inspector-General of Hospitals and Fleets Daniel John Duigan 
Deputy Surgeon-General John O'Nial, Army Medical Department
Surgeon-Major Samuel Black Roe  Army Medical Department
Deputy Commissary-General Henry John Brownrigg, Commissariat and Transport Staff
Assistant Commissary-General Henry Spencer Edward Reeves, Commissariat and Transport Staff

Civil Division

Colonel Lord Hatherton, the (King's Own) 2nd Stafford Militia
Lieutenant-Colonel and Honorary Colonel Samuel Brise Ruggles-Brise, West Essex Militia
Lieutenant-Colonel and Honorary Colonel David Carrick Robert Carrick Buchanan, 2nd Royal Lanark Militia
Lieutenant-Colonel and Honorary Colonel John Williams Wallington, Royal North Gloucester Militia
Lieutenant-Colonel and Honorary Colonel Sir John Stephen Robinson  Louth Militia
Lieutenant-Colonel and Honorary Colonel Sir Thomas Oriel Forster  Monaghan Militia
Lieutenant-Colonel Frederick Winn Knight, 1st Worcester Rifle Volunteer Corps
Lieutenant-Colonel David Davidson, 1st (The Queen's City of Edinburgh Rifle Volunteer Brigade)
Lieutenant-Colonel Sir Charles Watkin Shakerley  5th Cheshire Rifle Volunteer Corps
Lieutenant-Colonel Sir Walter Barttelot Barttelot  2nd Sussex Rifle Volunteer Corps
Lieutenant-Colonel the Honourable Charles Hugh Lindsay, 6th Middlesex (St. George's) Rifle Volunteer Corps
Lieutenant-Colonel and Vice-Admiral Thomas Chaloner, 1st North Riding of Yorkshire Artillery Volunteer Corps
Lieutenant-Colonel Ewen Macpherson, 1st Inverness (Highland) Rifle Volunteer Corps
Lieutenant-Colonel Addison Potter, 1st Northumberland and Durham Artillery Volunteer Corps
Lieutenant-Colonel Henry Sagar Hirst, 3rd West Riding of Yorkshire Rifle Volunteer Corps
Lieutenant-Colonel and Honorary Colonel Sir James Bourne  Royal Lancashire Artillery Militia
Lieutenant-Colonel Sir Henry Edwards  2nd West Riding of Yorkshire Yeomanry Cavalry
Lieutenant-Colonel Sir Henry Wilmot  1st Derbyshire Rifle Volunteer Corps
Lieutenant-Colonel Robert John Tilney, 5th Lancashire Rifle Volunteer Corps
Lieutenant-Colonel Edward Stock Hill, 1st Glamorgan Artillery Volunteer Corps
Lieutenant-Colonel Donald Matheson, 1st Lanarkshire Engineer Volunteer Corps
Lieutenant-Colonel and Honorary Colonel Leopold George Frederick Keane, Waterford Artillery, Militia
Sir Allen William Young, Commanding the London Brigade of the Royal Naval Artillery Volunteers
Ernest Hobart Inman, Commanding the Liverpool Brigade of the Royal Naval Artillery Volunteers
Charles Lister Ryan, Assistant Comptroller and Auditor-General
Frederick James Fegen, Paymaster in the Royal Navy
Captain Andrew Noble, late Royal Artillery

The Most Exalted Order of the Star of India

Knight Grand Commander (GCSI)
His Highness Sujjun Singh, Maharana of Udaipur

Knight Commander (KCSI)
General Orfeur Cavenagh, Bengal Staff Corps
Charles Umpherston Aitchison  Bengal Civil Service, Chief Commissioner British Burmah
His Highness Tukht Singh, Thakur Saheb of Bhavnagur
James Davidson Gordon  Bengal Civil Service, Resident at Mysore
John Forsyth  Inspector-General of Hospitals (Retired), Bengal Medical Service
Lepel Henry Griffin  Bengal Civil Service, Agent to the Governor-General in Central India

Companion (CSI)

Donald Campbell Macnabb, Bengal Civil Service (Retired), late Commissioner Punjab
Wazirzadah Muhammad Afzal Khan, late Political Assistant in Afghanistan
Major-General John Salusbury Trevor (Retired), Royal (late Bombay) Engineers, lately Director-General of State Railways
Horace Abel Cockerell, Bengal Civil Service, Secretary to the Government of Bengal, in the Judicial and Political Department
Colonel Samuel Black, Bengal Staff Corps, Secretary to the Government of the Punjab in the Military Department

The Most Distinguished Order of Saint Michael and Saint George

Knight Grand Cross of the Order of St Michael and St George (GCMG)
Sir Arthur Edward Kennedy  Governor and Commander-in-Chief of the Colony of Queensland
Major-General Sir Harry St George Ord  Royal Engineers

Knight Commander of the Order of St Michael and St George (KCMG)
Sir Francis Dillon Bell   Agent-General in England for New Zealand, and late Speaker of the House of Representatives in that Colony 
George Berkeley  Governor and Commander-in-Chief of the Leeward Islands 
Hector-Louis Langevin  Minister of Public Works in the Dominion of Canada 
Major-General George Richards Greaves  late Chief Secretary and Chief of the Staff in Cyprus 
Arthur Hunter Palmer, Colonial Secretary, and lately Premier of Queensland

Companion of the Order of St Michael and St George (CMG)
Augustus Frederick Gore, Lieutenant-Governor of the Island of Saint Vincent 
Major-General James Robert Mann, Royal Engineers, Director of Roads and Surveyor-General, Jamaica 
William Warren Streeten, Chief Justice of the West Africa Settlements 
Malcolm Fraser, Surveyor-General and Commissioner of Crown Lands, of Western Australia 
William Henry Marsh, Colonial Secretary and Auditor-General, Hong Kong 
Major John George Dartnell, Commandant of the Natal Mounted Police 
John William Dawson  Principal and Vice-Chancellor of the McGill University, Montreal, Canada 
Alpheus Todd  Librarian to the Parliament of the Dominion of Canada 
William Dealtry, late Chief Clerk of the Colonial Office 
Charles John Irving, Resident Councillor at Malacca, Straits Settlements 
Henry Nicholas Duverger Beyts, Receiver-General of Mauritius 
William Augustine Duncan, Collector of Customs, New South Wales 
Charles Bruce, Director of Public Instruction, Ceylon 
William MacGregor  Chief Medical Officer and Receiver-General, Fiji

References

Birthday Honours
1881 awards
1881 in Australia
1881 in Canada
1881 in India
1881 in the United Kingdom